Streptomyces sporoverrucosus is a bacterium species from the genus of Streptomyces. Streptomyces sporoverrucosus produces the antileukemic naphthocoumarins chrysomycin A, chrysomycin B, and chrysomycin C.

See also 
 List of Streptomyces species

References

Further reading

External links
Type strain of Streptomyces sporoverrucosus at BacDive -  the Bacterial Diversity Metadatabase

sporoverrucosus
Bacteria described in 1986